Pinyin is a Grassfields language spoken by some 27,000 people in the Northwest Region of Cameroon.

Phonology

Consonants 

Sequences are:
py (mby), ly (ndy), ty, ky, ngy, my, kẅ, ngẅ (= )
pw (mbw), lw (ndw), tw, tsw, chw, shw, sw, zw, zhw, nw, nyw, ŋw

All noun and verb roots begin with a consonant; initial vowels are necessarily prefixes. Only  occur in prefixes or at the beginning of words, and only  occurs in suffixes.  do not occur at the ends of words.

Vowels 

All known long vowels may occur medially or at ends of words, none at the beginning, though long  are not attested. Long vowels are written double: aa, əə, ii, ‿ɨɨ, oo, uu. Diphthongs ie, iə, ʉə, ɨə, uə take a single tone.

Tones are high, mid, low, rising, falling. They are written as in IPA, apart from low, which is not written: á ā a ǎ â. Falling tone is largely confined to suffixes, and rising tone is rare, found only on a few nouns such as tǎ 'father'.

References

The Pinyin Orthography Guide ( Mathaus  & Stephen C. Anderson, 2005)

Ngemba languages
Languages of Cameroon